Manasseh Maelanga (born March 25, 1970) is a member of the National Parliament of the Solomon Islands.  He represents East Malaita constituency.

In May 2009, he was named Minister for Provincial Government and Institutional Strengthening in Prime Minister Derek Sikua's government. Following the 2010 general election, he remained in Cabinet, under new Prime Minister Danny Philip, as Deputy Prime Minister and Minister of Home Affairs.

Since 17 December 2014, he has served as Leader of the Independent Members in Parliament.

References

External links
Member page at Parliament website

1970 births
Living people
Deputy Prime Ministers of the Solomon Islands
Members of the National Parliament of the Solomon Islands
People from Malaita Province
Government ministers of the Solomon Islands